The Via Aemilia Scauri was an ancient Roman road built by the consul Marcus Aemilius Scaurus during his term as censor in 109 BC.

Route 
It is mainly a coastal road, doubling Via Aurelia, and connecting Rome to Placentia and Pisa, passing through Genoa. Near the town of Cosa it runs inland and parallel to the Via Aurelia.

Further north the Via Aemilia Scauri merged with the Via Postumia to become the Via Julia Augusta.

References 

Aemilia Scauri, Via
Transport in Emilia-Romagna
Transport in Liguria
Transport in Tuscany
110s BC establishments
2nd-century BC establishments in the Roman Republic
2nd-century BC establishments in Italy